Vedat Demir (born April 5, 1966) is a professor at the Free University of Berlin. He formerly served as the General Secretary of the Turkish Press Council and was a professor at his alma mater, Istanbul University, before he was targeted and imprisoned by the Turkish government.

Early life and academic career 
Prof. Vedat Demir was born on April 5, 1966 in Sinop, Turkey. He received his bachelor's and master's degrees from Marmara University and his PhD from Istanbul University, where he taught political communication, media ethics and policy making between 2010 and 2016. He was a visiting scholar of Communications at Ithaca College and Near Eastern Studies at Cornell University, in Ithaca, New York between 2012 and 2014.

Demir formerly served as General Secretary of the Turkish Press Council from 2000 to 2003. As the former General Secretary of the Turkish Press Council, he has defended freedom of the press in Turkey throughout his academic and journalistic career. His scholarship focuses on the role of media in democracy and shaping public opinion. He is the author of The Ethics of Media (2006), The Relationship Between Media and Politics in Turkey (2007), and Public Diplomacy and Soft Power (2012).

2016–17 Turkish purges 
Demir has been an outspoken critic of the recent authoritarianism of the Turkish government, using his newspaper columns and television appearances to affirm democratic values, human rights, and rule of law.

In 2015, a group of Turkish intellectuals, including Prof. Demir, started a petition campaign titled “Silence the Guns” calling for a reconciliation between the Turkish government and the Kurdish militants to end the ongoing civil war in Eastern Turkey.

As a reaction to the government's seizure of critical newspapers and television stations in Turkey, Demir raised his voice in defense of press freedom and started writing at Yarına Bakış. In his columns he has also been a fierce defender of academic freedom.

On July 20, 2016, Professor Demir along with 95 colleagues at Istanbul University, were suspended from their academic positions.

In retaliation for his expression of academic opinions and journalistic activities, on July 24, Turkish police took Demir into custody, searched both house and office, and detained him without stating charges. During this period he was denied contact with his lawyer and family members. On August 3, he was formally arrested and jailed on suspicions of being involved in the movement behind the coup d'état attempt in Turkey. Demir has denied involvement in the movement, and publicly denounced the July 15 coup attempt in his column. As the State Department noted in its 2016 human rights report, thousands of Turkish academics and journalists were arrested after the attempted coup with fabricated evidence and little clarity on the charges. On September 1, 2016, Demir was formally dismissed from his duties at Istanbul University with a state of emergency decree that sacked thousands of academics in Turkish universities.

Seven months after his arrest, Prof. Demir was released from prison under judicial supervision with 5 other academics on February 14, 2016.

References 

1966 births
Living people
Turkish journalists
People from Sinop, Turkey
Istanbul University alumni
Academic staff of Istanbul University
Prisoners and detainees of Turkey
Journalists imprisoned in Turkey